The following is a list of Radio Disney Music Award winners and nominees for Song of the Year (formerly Best Song).

Winners and nominees

2000s

2010s

References

Song 01
Radio Disney Music Award